Luciano Daniel Arriagada García (born 30 April 2002) is a Chilean footballer who plays as a forward for Brazilian side Athletico Paranaense.

Club career
After leaving Colo-Colo, in 2023 Arriagada joined Brazilian club Athletico Paranaense on a deal until the 2025 season.

International career
At early age, he represented Chile at under-15 level in the 2017 South American U-15 Championship. In addition, he represented Chile U20 in a friendly tournament played in Teresópolis (Brazil) called Granja Comary International Tournament, making appearances in all the matches against Peru U20, Bolivia U20, and Brazil U20, scoring a goal in the second match.

Later, he was called up to the first training microcycle of the Chile senior team on 2021 and to the Chile squad for the 2021 Copa América, making his international debut in the match against Uruguay on June 21.

Career statistics

Club

Notes

Honours
Colo-Colo
Copa Chile: 2021
Chilean Primera División: 2022
Supercopa de Chile: 2022

References

External links

2002 births
Living people
People from Lota, Chile
Chilean footballers
Chilean expatriate footballers
Chile youth international footballers
Chile under-20 international footballers
Chile international footballers
2021 Copa América players
Colo-Colo footballers
Club Athletico Paranaense players
Chilean Primera División players
Chilean expatriate sportspeople in Brazil
Expatriate footballers in Brazil
Association football forwards